Anatoly Smirnov (born 5 April 1958) is a Russian former swimmer. He competed in two events at the 1976 Summer Olympics.

References

External links
 

1958 births
Living people
Russian male swimmers
Soviet male swimmers
Olympic swimmers of the Soviet Union
Swimmers at the 1976 Summer Olympics
Swimmers from Saint Petersburg